The 2007–08 Basketball League of Serbia season was the 2nd season of the Basketball League of Serbia, the highest professional basketball league in Serbia. It was also 64th national championship played by Serbian clubs inclusive of nation's previous incarnations as Yugoslavia and Serbia & Montenegro.

Regular season

First League standings

* Source: srbijasport.net

Super League standings

* Source: srbijasport.net

P=Matches played, W=Matches won, L=Matches lost, F=Points for, A=Points against, D=Points difference, Pts=Points

Playoff stage

External links

Basketball League of Serbia seasons
Serbia